ISIRTA episodes and songs: a list of episodes and sketches from the comedy radio series I'm Sorry, I'll Read That Again, and the songs which were featured in the episodes.

The songs are listed after the episodes on which they were featured (the listing of songs is unfortunately incomplete). Also included, where known, are the names of the script writers of the episodes, as well as the names of the singers and songwriters.

The original episode titles are unknown for the following songs:
 "Baby Samba" and "Rock With A Policeman".
 "Blimpht" is listed under two episodes in a special recording of "Robin Hood" / "The Curse of the Flying Wombat".
 "Identikit Gal" is listed under two episodes in a special recording of "Robin Hood" / "The Curse of the Flying Wombat".

For information about the cast and characters of the episodes and sketches, please click on the episode titles.

Episodes

I'm Sorry, I'll Read That Again